Margaret Dragu (born 1953) is a Canadian dancer, writer, performance artist and feminist.

Career
Dragu was born in Regina, Saskatchewan, in 1953. Growing up she was influenced by traditional Romanian folk dancing. As an adult she spent time in New York, Calgary, Montreal, Toronto and Vancouver. She began her dance career in Calgary in 1969, studying under Yone Kvietys Young, who was an instructor of movement using elements of Dada. From Calgary, Dragu moved to New York in 1971, where she began working with Alwin Nikolais, Murray Louis, and the Laura Foreman dance company, as well as members of the Judson Church. Her work with movement evolved to include elements of "burlesque, tap dancing, flamenco, and theatre." In 1973 Dragu moved to Montreal where she began a lengthy career as a striptease artist.

In 1975 Dragu moved to Toronto and became affiliated with artist-run collectives including A Space and 15 Dance Lab. She taught classes in aerobics and strip at the A Space gallery. In Toronto Dragu attempted to organize around strippers' rights with the help of the Canadian Labour Congress and the Association of Canadian Radio and Television Artists. The short lived strippers' union was called the Canadian Association for Burlesque Entertainers.

Dragu starred in the 1981 film Surfacing, directed by Claude Jutra and based on Margaret Atwood's 1972 novel of the same name.

In 1988 Dragu co-wrote Revelations: Essays on Striptease and Sexuality with A. S. A. Harrison, a collection of essays on the topics of striptease and sexual entertainment.

Dragu has stated that she has a "multi-personnae" disorder, becoming Lady Justice, Verb Woman, Art Cinderella, and Nuestra Señora del Pan.  For a performance at Edmonton's Vision of Hope monument, with a sword, salt, wine and scales that viewers associate with Lady Justice, she honored the women killed in the massacre at Montreal's École Polytechnique.

She has collaborated with artists such as Tom Dean, Colin Campbell, members of General Idea, Rodney Werden and Kate Craig, and members of the communities in which she performs.

In 2012, Dragu won the Governor General's Award in Visual and Media Arts.

Dragu resides in East Vancouver.  She created a radio show, Momz Radio which focused on interviewing mothers about their experiences with motherhood. Through this research, she wrote a book by the same name, Momz Radio: Mothers Talkback. Dragu has created video art for YouTube, and writes two blogs, which she updates as Lady Justice and Verb Woman respectively.

Film
I Vant to be Alone
(co-director, co-writer, choreographer & performer)
also starring Jackie Burroughs, Robert des Rosiers, & Claudia Moore
Breakthrough Films/T.V. Ontario/Telefilm/OFDC production, half-hour, 1988

Conserving Kingdom (half-hour pilot Dudley the Dragon TV series)
(choreographer)
Breakthrough Films/T.V. Ontario/Ontario Hydro production, 1987

Memories of Paradise
(co-writer, choreographer, performer)
Breakthrough Films,/T.V. Ontario production, half-hour, 1985

Video
"Breath"
Video Out Distribution/Western Front Video, 16:00, 1985 (http://www.videoout.ca/catalog/breath)

"Dance Reading" (with Susan Swan / Lawrence Adams)
Video Out Distribution, 23:00, 1985 (http://www.videoout.ca/catalog/dance-reading)

"Yo Soy Eine Kleine Shopkeeper"
Video In/Video Out Distribution, 10:00, 1993 (http://www.videoout.ca/catalog/yo-soy-eine-kleine-shopkeeper)

"Sleeping Tape"
Banff School of Fine Arts, 13:00, 1985 (http://www.videoout.ca/catalog/sleeping-tape)

"Bardo Gap" (With Bobbi Kozinuk)
Video Out/Western Front Video, 18:00, 1994 (http://www.videoout.ca/catalog/bardo-gap)

"Deconstructed Dollhouse"
Video Out Distribution, 20:00, 1996 (http://www.videoout.ca/catalog/deconstructed-dollhouse)

"Living Art"
Video Out Distribution, 7:00, 2001 (http://www.videoout.ca/catalog/living-art)

"Lady of Shallot - A Surveillance Player"
Video Out Distribution, 3:30, 2002 (http://www.videoout.ca/catalog/lady-shallot-surveillance-player)

"More Cleaning and loving It"
Video Out Distribution, 13:00, 2002 (http://www.videoout.ca/catalog/more-cleaning-and-loving-it)

"Lady Justice and the Epic Burden" (With Moira Simpson)
Video Out Distribution, 5:28, 2013 (http://www.videoout.ca/catalog/lady-justice-and-epic-burden)

"Portals"
Video Out Distribution, 13:43, 2013 (http://www.videoout.ca/catalog/portals)

References

Bibliography

Further reading

External links
Verb Woman
Lady Justice
Video Out

1953 births
Living people
Canadian performance artists
Women performance artists
Artists from Regina, Saskatchewan
Canadian conceptual artists
Women conceptual artists
Governor General's Award in Visual and Media Arts winners
21st-century Canadian women artists